Grace Robertson  (13 July 1930 – 11 January 2021) was a British photographer who worked as a photojournalist, and published in Picture Post and Life. Her photographic series, including "Mother's Day Off" (1954) and "Childbirth" (1955), mainly recorded ordinary women in postwar Britain.

Robertson's work is held in the collections of the National Galleries of Scotland, Science Museum Group, Tate and Victoria and Albert Museum.

Early life
Robertson was born in Manchester, England, in 1930, to the journalist Fyfe Robertson and his wife Elizabeth (Betty; née Muir). Both her parents were born in Scotland, and Robertson described herself as Scottish in a 2010 interview with The Scotsman. After leaving school at 16 she looked after her mother, who had rheumatoid arthritis. She became interested in photography in 1948 and, in 1949, her father gave her a Leica camera.

Career
In 1951 Robertson had a photo-essay about her younger sister doing her homework published in Picture Post, where her father worked. Another early success was on Chinese artists. Some of her early submissions used the masculine pseudonym "Dick Muir", to avoid using her father's name. Her first commission for Picture Post was in Snowdonia, which resulted in "Sheep Shearing in Wales" (1951). In 1952, she photographed the Bluebell Girls in Italy, and also published "Tate Gallery" (1952).

At the date she was working, most photojournalists were men, and she was often assigned more feminine stories. Working as a freelancer throughout her career, her best-known series, "Mother's Day Off", documented working-class women from Bermondsey in London, enjoying a day out in Margate, and was published in Picture Post in 1954. The middle-aged to elderly subjects are depicted dancing, drinking and on a fairground ride. She was commissioned to shoot a similar series featuring women from Clapham for Life magazine in 1956. The Scotsman describes both these sets of photographs as "perfectly composed, artifice-free examples of classic reportage". Her series "Childbirth", published in Picture Post in 1955, included photographs of a woman in labour and delivery, considered explicit at the time, and were among the earliest such images to appear in a magazine.

Around this time, Life offered her a staff job in the United States, but Robertson refused. After the failure of the Picture Post in 1957, she worked as a freelance photographer and photojournalist for Life and other publications, and also took advertising photographs. After having children, she trained and worked as a primary school teacher from 1966 to 1978, while continuing to take photographs. After retiring from teaching, she started to paint during the 1980s. In 1986, Channel 4 broadcast a documentary about Robertson, and her work was included in an exhibition at the National Museum of Photography, Film & Television in Bradford; several other exhibitions in the UK and the United States followed. In 1989, she published an autobiographical monograph, entitled Grace Robertson – Photojournalist of the 50s. In 1992, the BBC commissioned a programme from her about ninety year olds. She also gave lectures on women photographers.

Sean O'Hagan, writing in The Guardian, characterises Robertson's work as recording ordinary women in postwar Britain, and describes her as a "proto-feminist". Tirza Latimer and Harriet Riches consider her work to be "limited to a focus on women's interests."

Awards and honours
Robertson was awarded an Honorary Fellowship from the Royal Photographic Society in 1995 and appointed an OBE in 1999. She received honorary degrees from the University of Brighton (1995) and Brunel University (2007).

Personal life
Robertson who stood 6 ft 2in in her bare feet married in 1955 the Picture Post photographer Thurston Hopkins. They had two children. In the 1980s, on Hopkins' retirement, the couple moved to Seaford in East Sussex, where they remained until his death in 2014 at age 101.

Robertson died on 11 January 2021, aged 90.

Publications

Books of work by Robertson

Books of work with contributions by Robertson
Picture Post: Women. London: Collins & Brown, 1993. By Juliet Gardiner. .

Collections
Robertson's work is held in the following public collections:
National Galleries of Scotland, Scotland: 7 prints (as of January 2021)
Science Museum Group, UK: 3 prints (as of January 2021)
Tate, London: 7 prints (as of January 2021)
The Aldrich Collection, University of Brighton School of Art, Brighton and Hove: 2 prints (as of January 2021)
Victoria and Albert Museum, London: 22 prints (as of January 2021)
A portrait of Robertson by Rena Pearl is held in the collection of the National Portrait Gallery, London.

References

Further reading

External links
Selection of photographs including a self-portrait in The Guardian

1930 births
2021 deaths
English women photographers
Officers of the Order of the British Empire
Artists from Manchester
20th-century British photographers
English photojournalists
20th-century English women
20th-century English people
Picture Post photojournalists
Women photojournalists